Wings is an hour-long televised aviation history documentary program which aired on the Discovery Channel family of networks. It was produced by Phil Osborn.

Original program
Originally called Great Planes, the Wings program initially aired Wednesdays and Saturdays on the Discovery Channel in the United States from 9–10 p.m. Eastern beginning in 1988 and into the early 1990s.

Great Planes
Great Planes was the original subset of Wings episodes which focused on one particular aircraft type. The original Great Planes program was initially produced by Aviation Video International in Australia, and distributed by the Discovery Channel.

When it initially aired in America, the majority of episodes were narrated by the program's Australian writer and director, Luke Swann, with some others written and narrated by John Honey and Phil Chugg. In 1991 (notably following the first Gulf War), episodes were re-edited to include interviews with pilots of the profiled aircraft types before and following commercial breaks, and the narration was re-dubbed with American narrators Ron David and Tom Hair.

Episodes
 Boeing 707
 Boeing 747
 Boeing B-17 Flying Fortress
 Boeing B-29 Superfortress
 Boeing B-52 Stratofortress
 British Aerospace/McDonnell Douglas Harrier
 Consolidated B-24 Liberator
 Consolidated PBY Catalina
 Convair B-36 Peacemaker
 Douglas A-1 Skyraider
 Douglas A-4 Skyhawk
 Douglas A-26 Invader
 Douglas C-47 Dakota
 General Dynamics F-16 Fighting Falcon
 General Dynamics F-111 Aardvark
 Grumman F-14 Tomcat
 Grumman F4F Wildcat/F6F Hellcat
 Lockheed Constellation
 Lockheed C-130 Hercules
 Lockheed F-104 Starfighter
 Lockheed P-38 Lightning
 Lockheed SR-71 Blackbird
 Martin B-26 Marauder
 Martin B-57 Canberra
 McDonnell Douglas F-4 Phantom II
 McDonnell Douglas F-15 Eagle
 McDonnell Douglas F/A-18 Hornet
 North American B-25 Mitchell
 North American F-86 Sabre
 North American F-100 Super Sabre
 North American P-51 Mustang
 North American XB-70 Valkyrie
 Northrop F-5 Freedom Fighter
 Republic F-84 Thunderjet
 Republic F-105 Thunderchief
 Republic P-47 Thunderbolt
 Rockwell B-1 Lancer
 Vought A-7 Corsair II
 Vought F4U Corsair

Some other episodes profiled non-American aircraft, including the Aérospatiale-British Aerospace Concorde, Mitsubishi A6M Zero, Panavia Tornado, and Supermarine Spitfire.

Strange Planes 
A series of thirteen episodes, entitled Strange Planes (and later released on VHS video), focused on several unusual aircraft types.

Episodes 
 "Strange Shapes"
 "Parasites"
 "Vertical"
 "Giants"
 “Catapult Planes”
 ”Strangest Planes”
 “Pusher Planes” 
 “Feed The Birds”
 “Rubber Planes”
 “Hovercrafts”
 ”Circles In The Sky”
 “Drones.Midgets.Mutations…”
 “Eyes In The Sky”

Miscellaneous programs 
These programs were shown occasionally during the Wings time slot. They were produced from various sources.

 Air Combat Today
 Combat Aircraft of the Future  
 Modern Air Combat 3
 Modern Fighters
 Modern Missiles
 Naval Combat Aircraft
 Soviet Air Power
 The MiG Story
 US Air Power

Wings II 

Starting in the mid 1990s, newer Wings episodes, sometimes referred to as Wings II, would focus on the history or operations of a particular foreign air force, such as the Israeli Air Force, a foreign aviation company or design bureau such as France's Dassault or Russia's Mikoyan, or the aircraft of a particular conflict such as the Korean War or the Afghan-Soviet War. These episodes, narrated by Stuart Culpepper, often had interviews with the aircrews and famed aviation historian/writer Jeffrey Ethell, the "Fighter Writer".

Episodes 
 (A-4)	  "Hugging the Deck"
 (A-10)  "Steel Rain"	
 (AH-1)  "Whispering Death"
 (AH-64) "Guardians of the Night"
 (AV-8)  "Harrier"
 (B-1)	  "Doomsday Mission"
 (B-52)  "Instant Thunder"
 (F-15)  "Eagles Over Lebanon"
 (F-16)  "Flight of the Falcon"
 (F-105) "The Thud"
 (Mi-24) "Bear Trap"
 (Su-25) "Flying Tank"
 (U-2)	  "Spy Planes"
 (UH-1)  "Landing Zone Vietnam"
 "Flying Coffins"
 "Red October"
 "Top Guns"
 "Wings Over Europe
 "Wings: Target Berlin" (P-51)
 "Wings: Dresden Firestorm" (B-17)
 "Wings: The Valiant Few"(Spitfire)
 "Wings Over the Pacific"
 Wings Over Vietnam
 "Wings Over Vietnam: The Cavalry"
 "Wings Over Vietnam: The Gunships"

Spinoff programs

Wings of the Luftwaffe 

Wings of the Luftwaffe was a 1992 separately-branded program that focused on Luftwaffe aircraft of World War II. It was narrated by Helmut Bakaitis.

Episodes 
 "The Blitz" – Arado Ar 234
 "The Butcher Bird" – Focke-Wulf Fw 190
 "The Destroyer" – Messerschmitt Bf 110
 "Gigant" – Messerschmitt Me 321/323
 "Iron Annie" – Junkers Ju 52
 "The Jet" – Messerschmitt Me 262
 "The Komet" – Messerschmitt Me 163
 "The Legend" – Messerschmitt Bf 109
 "The Schnell Bomber" – Junkers Ju 88
 "Sea Wings" – German Seaplanes
 "The Secret Bomber" – Heinkel He 111
 "The Stuka" – Junkers Ju 87
 "V for Vengeance" – V-1 flying bomb

Wings of the Luftwaffe: Fighter Attack was a one-hour 1994 post-production program which included parts of the episodes about the Focke-Wulf Fw 190, the Messerschmitt Me 262, and the Messerschmitt Bf 109. It was included in the Wings Collection set:  one VHS tape of a 1998 six VHS tape collection and part of the 2003 one DVD disc version.

Wings of the Red Star 

Wings of the Red Star was a separately-branded program that focused on Soviet Air Force aircraft from World War II to the modern era. It was narrated by actor Sir Peter Ustinov.

Episodes 
 "The Backfire Bomber" – Soviet supersonic bomber development, including the Tupolev Tu-22M 'Backfire' and the Tu-160 'Blackjack'
 "Duel over Korea" – Development and career of the Mikoyan-Gurevich MiG-15 'Fagot'
 "The Flying Tank" – Ilyushin Il-2 'Sturmovik'
 "The Foxbat" – Development leading up to the Mikoyan-Gurevich MiG-25 'Foxbat'
 "The Great Patriotic War" – History of the air war on the eastern front during World War II
 "The Last Generation" – Late-model Soviet fighters, including the Mikoyan-Gurevich MiG-29 'Fulcrum' and the Sukhoi Su-27 'Flanker'
 "The Nuclear Bear" – Development of long-range strategic bombers, including the Tupolev Tu-95 'Bear'
 "The Phantom's Foe" – Supersonic fighter development leading to the Mikoyan-Gurevich MiG-21 'Fishbed'
 "Russian Giants" – Giant Soviet transport aircraft leading up to the Antonov An-124 and Antonov An-225 Mriya.
 "Soviet Rotors" – Development of Soviet helicopters
 "Straight Up" – Soviet Vertical Take-off aircraft, including the Yakovlev Yak-38 'Forger' and Yak-141 'Freestyle'
 "Supersonic Transport" – Development of the Tupolev Tu-144
 "The Swing-Wing Solution" – Development leading up to the Mikoyan-Gurevich MiG-23/Mikoyan MiG-27 'Flogger'

SeaWings 

SeaWings, narrated by Edward Easton, was a separately-branded program that focused on United States (and some foreign) naval aircraft from World War II to the present day, including:

 Grumman A-6 Intruder ("Thunder from the Sea")
 Grumman F9F Panther/Cougar
 Grumman F-14 Tomcat ("Defender of the Fleet")
 Grumman TBF Avenger ("The Avenger")
 Lockheed P-3 Orion ("The Hunter")
 Lockheed S-3 Viking ("The Scout")
 McDonnell-Douglas F-18 Hornet ("The Killer Bee")
 North American A-5 Vigilante
 Dassault-Breguet Super Etendard ("The Falkland Surprise")
 Vought F-8 Crusader ("The Last Gunfighter")
 Air-sea rescue aircraft and operations ("Wings of Mercy")

Wings Over the Gulf 

Following the Gulf War of 1991, Discovery produced a new short-run program, Wings Over the Gulf, profiling the air war over Iraq before and during Operation Desert Storm, and select aircraft types used by coalition forces. The program was narrated by Will Lyman, and was released on VHS.

Episodes 
 "First Strike" – The run-up to and beginning of Operation Desert Storm (McDonnell-Douglas F-15 Eagle/Lockheed F-117 Nighthawk)
 "In Harm's Way" – The air war over Iraq at the height of Operation Desert Storm (Panavia Tornado/Grumman A-6 Intruder)
 "The Final Assault" – The final days of Desert Storm, including the ground war and the liberation of Kuwait (General Dynamics F-16 Fighting Falcon/Fairchild-Republic A-10 Thunderbolt II)

A separate episode that aired around this time period was "Nighthawk: Secrets of the Stealth"

Wings Over Vietnam: The Missions 

In 2002, this eight-episode program was aired, hosted by David Scott.

 "The FACs"
 "Dust Off"
 "Rolling Thunder"
 "The Jolly Greens"
 "Spookies, Spectres, and Shadows"
 "MiG Killers"
 "Wild Weasels"
 "Linebacker II"

Revival 

In 2008, Great Planes was revived in a modernized format, hosted by Paul "Max" Moga and Terry Dietz, that aired on the Military Channel in the United States.

Legacy 
After a lengthy run in the late 1980s and early 1990s in the Wednesday/Saturday time slot, Discovery moved Wings to every weekday from 6 to 7 p.m. Eastern, under the banner "Weekday Wings". The program ended its weekday run in the late 90s.

Discovery Wings channel 
The program formed the backbone for the Discovery Wings channel in the United States and United Kingdom, which launched in 1999. Discovery Wings was rebranded into the Military Channel in 2005 and Discovery Turbo in 2007, respectively.

Some episodes are available on VHS via eBay and Amazon. "Great Planes" episodes are available on DVD in Australia through Magna Pacific.

Luke Swann died on 6 October 2000 after a brief battle with liver cancer. He is survived by his two daughters, Emily and Madeleine, and son Jack.

Producer Phil Osborn went on to found AeroCinema, an online aviation history video web site which produces and hosts documentaries similar to Wings and which are viewable online only via paid subscription.

References

External links 
 
 
 
 Great Planes / Wings Database (http://myplace.frontier.com/~usnraptor/Great_Planes)
 http://thetvdb.com/?tab=series&id=187401
 http://thetvdb.com/?tab=seasonall&id=264371
 http://www.magnahomeentertainment.com.au/index.php/movies/list/29-discovery-channel

Discovery Channel original programming
Documentary television series about aviation
1988 American television series debuts
1980s American television series
1990s American television series
2000s American television series